Govindaswamy Karuppiah Moopanar (19 August 1931 – 30 August 2001) known as G. K. Moopanar was a Tamil Nadu Congress Committee leader, parliamentarian, and social worker.He was served as Member of the Rajya Sabha , president of Tamil Nadu Congress Committee and general secretary of All India Congress Committee. from 1980 to 1988. Moopanar was a close associate of Congress leader and former Tamil Nadu Chief Minister, K. Kamaraj.

Early life

Moopanar was born on 19 August 1931 at Kabisthalam village in the composite Thanjavur district, the rice granary of Tamil Nadu. His father was R. Govindaswamy Moopanar and his mother was Saraswathi Ammal. He belonged to a family of landed aristocracy that owned vast tracts of fertile land. His father R. Govindaswamy Moopanar was a Congressman. The family patronised music, arts and literature. Moopanar himself was president of the Tiruvaiyaru Sri Thyaga Brahma Mahotsava Sabha from 1980 until his death. This Sabha conducts the annual Thyagaraja music festival at Tiruvaiyaru, the saint-composer’s birthplace.

Political career
Moopanar first met Kamaraj and Jayaprakash Narayan when they called on his father Govindasamy Moopanar at his home at Sundaraperumal Kovil, near Kumbakonam, in 1951. Kamaraj was then TNCC president. Moopanar became the president of the Thanjavur district Congress committee in 1965. When the Congress split in 1969 Moopanar continued with Kamaraj. After Kamaraj’s death on 2 October 1975, the two Congress factions in Tamil Nadu merged in 1976. At the merger function, Indira Gandhi announced that Moopanar would be the president of the unified TNCC.

From then onwards, his rise in the Congress was swift. He was TNCC president from 1976 to 1980, and again in 1988–89. He was a puissant AICC general secretary from 1980 to 1988. Moopanar founded the Tamil Maanila Congress in the year 1996 (TMC) party. He was a Rajya Sabha member when he died. Both Indira Gandhi and Rajiv Gandhi offered him ministership but he declined.

He also shunned the Prime Minister’s post offered to him in April 1997 after the fall of the United Front government led by H.D. Deve Gowda. In a volume titled Makkal Thalaivar Moopanar, published by a TMC leader in August 2000, former Union Minister R. Dhanuskodi Athithan has recalled that CPI(M) general secretary Harkishan Singh Surjeet declared that "Mr. Moopanar is the best and first choice" for the prime ministership. West Bengal Chief Minister Jyoti Basu seconded the choice. However Karunanithi and Murasoli Maran did not agree to it, so Moopanar declined the offer.

The TMC felt orphaned with the death of Moopanar. The party quickly tried to steady itself when at a meeting of its legislators, Rajya Sabha members and leaders on 1 September, Moopanar’s son G.K. Vasan was elected TMC president.

After the demise of Moopanar, under the new leadership of his son G K Vasan, the TMC merged back with the Congress led by Sonia Gandhi.

References

1931 births
2001 deaths
Indian National Congress politicians from Tamil Nadu
People from Thanjavur district
Tamil Maanila Congress politicians